The McMillan Memorial Library is a public library situated in Nairobi, Kenya. It is the oldest library in Nairobi, and the second oldest in Kenya after the Seif bin Salim Library in Mombasa.

History
The library was built by the McMillan family to celebrate William Northrup McMillan, who died in 1925. Conceived by Lucie McMillan, construction of the building was largely financed by the Carnegie Corporation of New York, close family friends of the McMillans. The Library was officially opened on 5 June 1931 by Sir Joseph A. Byrne, Governor of Kenya.

Design
The building is a neo-classical design featuring granite-clad columns along the façade and a grand white marble trapezoidal stairway leading up to the portico. Two lions statues guard either side of the entrance. The statues were donated by Sir John and Lady Harrington, cousins of McMillan. The external walls were constructed of smooth rendered stone under a flat roof and the internal walls are clad in polished timber panels. The windows are glazed in tall steel casements allowing for ample natural lighting and the doors are made of heavy hardwood panels hung in timber frames, pedimented to the lintels. The floors are finished in parquet to the main areas with terrazzo to the entrance way.

Collections
The library holds more than 400,000 books including East African newspapers and periodicals dating back to 1901. It has been home to the proceedings of Parliamentary  since its inception.

The McMillan Memorial Library Act

The McMillan Memorial Library is the only building in Kenya protected by a specific Act of Parliament, the McMillan Memorial Library Act Cap 217 of 1938 which provided that the library was for the exclusive use of Europeans in addition to the usual conditions for preservation of monuments. The library was bequeathed to the Nairobi City Council and was opened to the general public in 1962.

Restoration 
Restoration efforts to restore the library and its branches in Kaloleni and Makadara are being spearheaded by Wanjiru Koinange and Angela Wachuka under Book Bunk Trust.

References

Public libraries
Libraries in Kenya
Buildings and structures in Nairobi
Libraries established in 1931